Pantomime Quiz, initially titled Pantomime Quiz Time and later Stump the Stars, was an American television game show produced and hosted by Mike Stokey. Running from 1947—1959, it has the distinction of being one of the few television series—along with The Arthur Murray Party; Down You Go; The Ernie Kovacs Show, The Original Amateur Hour; and Tom Corbett, Space Cadet—to air on all four TV networks in the US during the Golden Age of Television.

Overview
Based on the parlor game of Charades, Pantomime Quiz was first broadcast locally in Los Angeles from November 13, 1947, to 1949. In that format, it won an Emmy Award for "Most Popular Television Program" at the first Emmy Awards ceremony. The competition involved two teams of four contestants each (three regulars and one guest). In each round, one member acts out (in mime) a phrase or a name while the other three try to guess it. Each team had five rounds (in some broadcasts there were only four); the team that took the least amount of time to guess all phrases won the game.

Home viewers were encouraged to send in suggestions for phrases to be used in a telecast. Those that were actually used earned cash or a prize for the people who sent them. A bonus was given if the team trying to solve it could not do so within two minutes.

Broadcast history (national)
In June 1949, Pantomime Quiz became the "first locally [Hollywood] originated show to be aired in New York via kine recordings." The broadcasts over WCBS-TV were sponsored by Chevrolet dealers "beginning early in September for a price of about $1,200 weekly."

The program was picked up by CBS Television in October 1949 and ran on that network, usually during the summers, until August 28, 1951. After this, NBC Television took it as a mid-season replacement from January 2 to March 26, 1952. CBS then took back the series from July 4 to August 28, 1952. NBC never aired the program again. Reruns of the show, with the title Hollywood Guess Stars, began on WPIX in New York City on November 20, 1952.

The DuMont Television Network took the series from October 20, 1953, to April 13, 1954, after which it went back to CBS from July 9 to August 27, 1954.

ABC finally took the charades game for a mid-season slot much like NBC, airing the durable quiz from January 22 to March 6, 1955. After CBS took it back they ran it for three more summers (July 8 to September 30, 1955; July 6 to September 7, 1956; July 5 to September 6, 1957) before the network dropped the program altogether.

After a seven-month absence, ABC picked up Pantomime Quiz from April 8, 1958, to September 2, 1958; on May 18, 1959, the show began airing on ABC in daytime and concurrently with a primetime show beginning on June 8. However, September 28 saw the end of the primetime version, with the daytime version ending October 9, 1959.

An Australian version aired in 1957 on Melbourne station GTV-9 and Sydney station ATN-7, with Harry Dearth, George Foster and Jim Russell among those appearing, but proved to be short-lived, running from March to November.

Revivals

On September 17, 1962, Pantomime Quiz returned to the air as Stump the Stars on CBS with Pat Harrington, Jr. as the emcee. Stokey replaced Harrington on December 17 and continued as both host and producer until the September 16, 1963, finale.

Soon after, Stokey began recording a new syndicated version which ran from February 24 to September 2, 1964. It returned five years later (September 8, 1969) as Mike Stokey's Stump the Stars. As the title suggests, Stokey returned once again to host.

Celebrity Charades

January 1979 brought another syndicated revival with a few tweaks and a new name - Celebrity Charades. Jay Johnson was the host; This version aired until September. The first three episodes reran on GSN in the 1990s.

On June 20, 2005, AMC revived the series, which was presented by Hilary Swank and her then-husband Chad Lowe. Swank, Lowe, and director Bob Balaban were the producers - although only Lowe hosted. In this version each team had its own room in which to compete. One player from each team is sent to midstage (actually the middle of a New York City loft apartment) to retrieve a phrase to be acted out in his/her team's room. When the team guesses the phrase correctly, the person making correct guess is sent out to midstage for another clue, and so forth until five phrases are guessed. The first team that guesses the phrases' common theme wins the game.  However, this version did worse than any of the ones before it, running for  a mere five episodes until the experiment ended on June 24.

Celebrity guests
Some of the "stars" who were "stumped" on Pantomime Quiz or Stump the Stars:

 Nick Adams
 Anna Maria Alberghetti
 Morey Amsterdam
 Lucie Arnaz
 Ed Begley
 Zina Bethune
 Janet Blair
 Amanda Blake
 Carol Burnett
 Raymond Burr
 Sebastian Cabot
 Roger C. Carmel
 Dane Clark
 Robert Clary
 Jan Clayton
 Hans Conried
 Jackie Coogan
 Jeanne Crain
 Robert Culp
 Dan Dailey
 Sammy Davis Jr.
 Yvonne De Carlo
 Angie Dickinson
 Peter Donald
 Diana Dors
 Nanette Fabray
 Nina Foch
 John Forsythe
 Beverly Garland
 Alice Ghostley
 Frank Gorshin
 Rocky Graziano
 James Gregory
 Barbara Hale
 Ty Hardin
 Dorothy Hart
 William Hopper
 Robert Horton
 Tab Hunter
 Adele Jergens
 Stubby Kaye
 Milt Kamen
 Eartha Kitt
 Bert Lahr
 Hedy Lamarr
 Michael Landon
 Angela Lansbury
 Gypsy Rose Lee
 Ruta Lee
 Jerry Lewis
 Art Linkletter
 Richard Long
 Deanna Lund
 Carol Lynley
 Gisele MacKenzie
 Gordon MacRae
 Sheila MacRae
 Jayne Mansfield
 Rose Marie
 E.G. Marshall
 Ross Martin
 Lee Marvin
 Roddy McDowall
 Vera Miles
 Mary Tyler Moore
 Terry Moore
 Howard Morris
 Don Murray
 Tommy Noonan
 George O'Brien
 Dick Patterson
 Tom Poston
 Mala Powers
 Paula Prentiss
 Vincent Price
 Robert Reed
 Mickey Rooney
 Maxie Rosenbloom
 Jane Russell
 Tommy Sands
 Lizabeth Scott
 Martha Scott
 William Shatner
 Allan Sherman
 Nancy Sinatra
 Connie Stevens
 Elaine Stritch
 William Talman
 Karen Valentine
 Dick Van Dyke
 Elena Verdugo
 Clint Walker
 Ruth Warrick
 Grant Williams
 Alan Young

Episode status
Many episodes of Stump the Stars and Pantomime Quiz exist, and are held by the UCLA Film and Television Archive.

A few episodes that appear to be public domain have been available on the private trading circuit; and also appear on YouTube.

See also
Party Game—Canadian game show similar to Pantomime Quiz
 List of programs broadcast by the DuMont Television Network
 List of surviving DuMont Television Network broadcasts
 Hollywood Game Night

References

Bibliography
David Weinstein, The Forgotten Network: DuMont and the Birth of American Television (Philadelphia: Temple University Press, 2004) 
Alex McNeil, Total Television, Fourth edition (New York: Penguin Books, 1980) 
Tim Brooks and Earle Marsh, The Complete Directory to Prime Time Network TV Shows, Third edition (New York: Ballantine Books, 1964)

External links

Stump the Stars episode guide at Classic TV Info
DuMont historical website

1947 American television series debuts
1959 American television series endings
1940s American game shows
1950s American game shows
American Broadcasting Company original programming
Black-and-white American television shows
Black-and-white Australian television shows
CBS original programming
DuMont Television Network original programming
English-language television shows
NBC original programming
1957 Australian television series debuts
1950s Australian game shows